Timur Igramutdinovich Suleymanov (born 17 March 2000) is a Russian football player who plays as a centre-forward for FC Pari Nizhny Novgorod.

Club career
He made his debut in the Russian Professional Football League for FC Kazanka Moscow on 17 July 2019 in a game against FC Kolomna.

He made his Russian Premier League debut for FC Lokomotiv Moscow on 11 August 2019 in a game against FC Ural Yekaterinburg, as an 85th-minute substitute for Aleksei Miranchuk.

On 29 July 2020, he joined FC Nizhny Novgorod on loan for the 2020–21 season.

On 26 June 2021, he moved to Nizhny Novgorod on a permanent basis. He scored his first Russian Premier League goal for Nizhny Novgorod on 1 August 2021 in a 1–1 away draw against FC Ural Yekaterinburg.

On 17 March 2023, Suleymanov extended his contract with FC Pari Nizhny Novgorod (as Nizhny Novgorod was renamed by then) until the end of the 2025–26 season.

Career statistics

References

External links
 
 
 

2000 births
People from Derbent
Sportspeople from Dagestan
21st-century Russian people
Living people
Russian footballers
Russia youth international footballers
Russia under-21 international footballers
Association football forwards
FC Lokomotiv Moscow players
FC Nizhny Novgorod (2015) players
Russian Premier League players
Russian First League players
Russian Second League players